Woźniki may refer to the following places:
Woźniki, Piotrków County in Łódź Voivodeship (central Poland)
Woźniki, Radomsko County in Łódź Voivodeship (central Poland)
Woźniki, Zduńska Wola County in Łódź Voivodeship (central Poland)
Woźniki, Lubliniec County in Silesian Voivodeship (south Poland)
Woźniki, Zawiercie County in Silesian Voivodeship (south Poland)
Woźniki, Lesser Poland Voivodeship (south Poland)
Woźniki, Łosice County in Masovian Voivodeship (east-central Poland)
Woźniki, Płock County in Masovian Voivodeship (east-central Poland)
Woźniki, Płońsk County in Masovian Voivodeship (east-central Poland)
Woźniki, Gniezno County in Greater Poland Voivodeship (west-central Poland)
Woźniki, Grodzisk Wielkopolski County in Greater Poland Voivodeship (west-central Poland)